Hemydacnini is a tribe of leaf beetles in the subfamily Eumolpinae. It contains two genera, Hemydacne and Colasita, which are found in Madagascar.

References

Beetle tribes
Eumolpinae